The Feast of the Goat is a 2005 Dominican-Spanish-British drama film directed by Luis Llosa and starring Tomas Milian, Isabella Rossellini, Paul Freeman, Juan Diego Botto and Stephanie Leonidas.  It is based on Mario Vargas Llosa's 2000 novel of the same name.

Cast
Tomas Milian as Rafael Leonidas Trujillo
Isabella Rossellini as Urania
Paul Freeman as Agustín Cabral
Juan Diego Botto as Amadito García Guerrero
Stephanie Leonidas as Uranita
Shawn Elliott as Johnny Abbes García
Murphy Guyer as Turk
Richard Bekins as Manuel Alfonso
Jordan Lage as Gral. Pupo Román
Carlos Miranda as Antonio Imbert Barrera
Steven Bauer as Juan José Viñas
David Zayas as Antonio de la Maza
Eileen Atkins as Aunt Adelina
Gary Piquer as Galindez

References

External links
 

British drama films
Spanish drama films
Films based on Peruvian novels
Films directed by Luis Llosa
Dominican Republic drama films
Films about Latin American military dictatorships
Films based on works by Mario Vargas Llosa
2000s English-language films
English-language Spanish films
English-language Dominican Republic films
2000s British films